{{Infobox election
| election_name      = 2011 Fianna Fáil leadership election
| country            = 
| type               = presidential
| ongoing            = no
| previous_election  = 2008 Fianna Fáil leadership election
| previous_year      = 2008
| next_election      =
| next_year          =
| election_date      = 
| 1blank             = 1st preference
| 2blank             = 2nd count
| 3blank             = Final count
| image1             = 
| candidate1         = Micheál Martin
| party1             = 
| leaders_seat1      =
| 1data1             = 
| 2data1             = 
| 3data1             = | percentage1        =
| image2             = 
| candidate2         = Éamon Ó Cuív
| party2             = 
| leaders_seat2      =
| 1data2             = 
| 2data2             = 
| 3data2             = 
| percentage2        =
| image4             = 
| colour4            = 0
| candidate4         = Brian Lenihan Jnr
| party4             = 
| leaders_seat4      =
| 1data4             = 
| 2data4             = 
| percentage4        =
| candidate5         = Mary Hanafin
| image5             = 
| party5             = 
| leaders_seat5      =
| 1data5             = 
| percentage5        =
| title              = Leader
| posttitle          =
| before_election    = Brian Cowen
| after_election     = Micheál Martin
}}
The 2011 Fianna Fáil leadership election''' was called by party leader Brian Cowen on 22 January 2011, when he announced that he was resigning as president and leader of the party.  He remained as Taoiseach until after the 2011 general election.

The deadline for nominations closed at 1 p.m. on 24 January, and the new leader was elected at a special Fianna Fáil parliamentary party meeting on 26 January. Micheál Martin was elected as the party's eighth leader.

Candidates

Standing
Mary Hanafin – Minister for Tourism, Culture and Sport and Minister for Enterprise, Trade and Innovation
Brian Lenihan Jnr – Minister for Finance
Micheál Martin – Former Minister for Foreign Affairs
Éamon Ó Cuív – Minister for Social Protection, Minister for Defence and Minister for the Environment, Heritage and Local Government

Declined to stand
Conor Lenihan – Minister of State for Science, Technology, Innovation and Natural Resources

Results

Only TDs who were members of the Fianna Fáil parliamentary party were eligible to vote. Jimmy Devins rejoined the parliamentary party on 25 January, a day before the leadership election, bringing the total number of eligible voters to 72.

RTÉ News reported that Martin had received 33 first preference votes, compared to Ó Cuív's 15, Lenihan's 14 and Hanafin's 10; it added that the election ended on the third count, with Ó Cuív the runner-up. When Hanafin had been eliminated and her votes redistributed, Ó Cuív and Lenihan were equal on 18 votes each; Lenihan was then eliminated, having received fewer first preferences.

References

2011 elections in the Republic of Ireland
2011 in Irish politics
Fianna Fáil leadership election
Fianna Fáil leadership elections
History of Fianna Fáil
Indirect elections
Micheál Martin